A Tract on Monetary Reform is a book by John Maynard Keynes, published in 1923. Keynes presented an argument in favour of a policy that would try to stabilize the domestic price level. He argued that the Bank of England had the policy tools available to provide a semblance of price stability through its stance on interest rates and its capacity to manage the reserves of the banking sector. Keynes believed that domestic price stability was accompanied by exchange rate flexibility. After years of experience, he did not favour floating exchange rates and proposed what is today called a crawling peg.

Reference 

1923 non-fiction books
Keynesian economics
Books by John Maynard Keynes